Yapsie Rural LLG is a local-level government (LLG) of Sandaun Province, Papua New Guinea. Mountain Ok languages are spoken in the LLG.

Wards
01. Imnai 1
02. Imnai 2
03. Bitapena
04. Tumolbil
05. Ivikmin
06. Kemeimin
07. Urapmin
08. Sokonga
09. Bakading
10. Fungal
11. Bilka
12. Bokembil
13. Wauru
14. Defakbil
15. Mututeimin
16. Umfokmin
17. Atensikin
18. Mongapbip
19. Fiamok
20. Busulmin

References

Local-level governments of Sandaun Province